The Flying Boomerangs are the underage Indigenous Australian Australian rules football team for men (the underage women's team is known as the Woomeras). The team has played tests against junior teams from Papua New Guinea, South Africa, New Zealand and developing pacific nations.

History
In 2013, the Flying Boomerangs toured to play the South African national Australian rules football team in both Australia and South Africa. They toured Papua New Guinea, the first international team to defeat them in Australian rules football and also New Zealand winning both matches.

The team is named after the aboriginal hunting tool, the boomerang.  The senior equivalent team is the Indigenous All-Stars.

Apart from representing Australia in international Australian Rules Football, the Flying Boomerangs team members have gone on to play in the Australian Football League.

Other tours include Papua New Guinea (2009), Tonga (2010) and Fiji (2011) to compete against the underage Oceania and Pacific Islands teams. Andrew Mcleod (head coach) and Chris Johnson (assistant coach) were also part of the team in 2010. In 2017 Barry Lawrence was named head coach and Harry Miller as assistant coach.

The Flying Boomerangs have been featured nationally in a documentary on ABC TV during their tour to South Africa.

Alumni

 Austin Wonaeamirri
 Leroy Jetta
 Malcolm Lynch
 Cameron Stokes
 Isaac Weetra
 Nathan Krakouer
 Steven May

 Curtly Hampton
 Rex Liddy
 Jarman Impey
 Jamarra Ugle-Hagan
 Peter Yagmoor
 Callum Ah Chee 
 Joel Jeffrey
 Willie Rioli

International and Tour Matches

See also
Indigenous All-Stars

References

Indigenous Australian sport
Australian rules football representative teams